Cheryl Lu-Lien Tan is a Singapore-born author and journalist who is based in New York.

Born and raised in Singapore, she moved to the U.S. to study at the Northwestern University in Evanston, Illinois. As a journalist, she has been a staff writer at the Wall Street Journal, In Style magazine and the Baltimore Sun, and she has published stories at mainstream media like The New York Times, The Paris Review, The Washington Post, Foreign Policy or Newsweek, among many other places.

She has been an active member of the Asian American Journalists Association. As an author, she has published and co-edited some best-seller books.

Works 
 A Tiger in the Kitchen (Hyperion, 2011)
 Sarong Party Girls (William Morrow, 2016)
 Singapore Noir  (Akashic Books, 2014) editor
 Anonymous Sex (Scribner Books, 2022) co-creator and co-editor

References

External links 
 

Singaporean writers
Northwestern University alumni
Writers from New York City
Year of birth missing (living people)
Living people